Tarkanian, Tarkanyan, Tarkhanian or Tarkhanyan (Armenian: Թարխանյան) is an Armenian surname that may refer to:

Danny Tarkanian (born 1961), American Armenian real estate and small business owner, son of Jerry 
Jerry Tarkanian (1930–2015), American college basketball coach of Armenian ancestry

See also
Tarkan (disambiguation)

Armenian-language surnames